The Junior Writer Awards (JWA) is educational charitable community outreach initiative and an English literacy writing competition for secondary school students based in Hong Kong and Macau. It was founded in 2014 by Norton House Education, and organised jointly with Upper House Academy in Macau, Education Bureau of Hong Kong, British Council, University of Hong Kong, Cambridge University, Oxford University Press, Eslite Bookstore and South China Morning Post, as a philanthropic educational initiative to raise English literacy levels, thinking skills and social awareness of secondary students in Hong Kong and Macau.

Winners 
Past winners include:

Junior Group 

Age Group: 11–13 years

Intermediate Group 

Age Group: 14–16 years

Advanced Group 

Age Group: 16+ years

Greatest Pen Winner

Greatest Potential

Most Inspirational

Most Innovative

Scholastic Writer

Most Promising Young Writer

References 

 Junior Writers Awards (South China Morning Post) official Website: http://yp.scmp.com/juniorwritersawards
 Junior Writers Awards Winners 2014: http://www.jwya.org/top-writers-winners/winners-2014
 Junior Writers Awards Top 100 Winner 2014 on South China Morning Post: https://apiwinecircle.scmp.com/YoungPost/juniorwriterawards/result.php
 2014 Mar 31 - Apple Daily (Hong Kong): 延續已故港大抗癌鬥士精神　伍庭發表弟　膺最佳少年作家 http://hk.apple.nextmedia.com/news/art/20140331/18674324
 2014 Mar 31 - Sing Tao Daily (Hong Kong): 頌讚抗癌鬥士　表弟奪作家獎 http://std.stheadline.com/yesterday/edu/0331go03.html
 2014 Mar 31 - Ming Pao (Hong Kong): 港大抗癌鬥士垂範後輩 頓悟生命寶貴 表弟繼承不放棄精神 http://news2.mingpao.com/pns/%E6%B8%AF%E5%A4%A7%E6%8A%97%E7%99%8C%E9%AC%A5%E5%A3%AB%E5%9E%82%E7%AF%84%E5%BE%8C%E8%BC%A9-%E9%A0%93%E6%82%9F%E7%94%9F%E5%91%BD%E5%AF%B6%E8%B2%B4%20%20%E8%A1%A8%E5%BC%9F%E7%B9%BC%E6%89%BF%E4%B8%8D%E6%94%BE%E6%A3%84%E7%B2%BE%E7%A5%9E/web_tc/article/20140331/s00011/1396203932209
 2014 Mar 27 - Va Kio Daily (Macau): 英文寫作「少年作家獎」頒獎  十三歲楊樂至膺「最佳作家」 http://www.vakiodaily.com/index.php?tn=viewer&ncid=1&nid=205808&dt=20140327&lang=tw
 2014 Mar 20 - South China Morning Post (Hong Kong): Legacy of a cancer hero http://www.yp.scmp.com/home/website/article.aspx?id=6421
 2014 Mar 20 - South China Morning Post (Hong Kong): Freddie's my inspiration http://www.yp.scmp.com/home/website/article.aspx?id=6422
 2014 Mar 20 - South China Morning Post (Hong Kong): How does the rule of law affect me? http://www.yp.scmp.com/home/website/article.aspx?id=6431
 2014 Mar 20 - South China Morning Post (Hong Kong): Going back to the Age of Exploration http://www.yp.scmp.com/home/website/article.aspx?id=6432
 2014 Mar 20 - Macao Daily News (Macau): 培正生獲少年作家潛質 - http://www.macaodaily.com/html/2014-03/20/content_887678.htm
 2014 Mar 20 - Macao Daily News (Macau): 永援教師校本培訓 - http://www.macaodaily.com/html/2014-03/20/content_887679.htm
 2014 Mar 18 - South China Morning Post (Hong Kong): Heartfelt story takes top gong - http://www.yp.scmp.com/home/website/article.aspx?id=6407&section=hong

External links 

 

English literary awards
Education in Hong Kong
Education in Macau
Awards established in 2014